The Gleane Baronetcy, of Hardwick in the County of Norfolk, was a title in the Baronetage of England. It was created on 6 March 1666 for Peter Gleane, Member of Parliament for Norfolk. The title became extinct on the death of the fourth Baronet in 1745.

Gleane baronets, of Hardwick (1666)
Sir Peter Gleane, 1st Baronet (1619–1695)
Sir Thomas Gleane, 2nd Baronet ( – c. 1700)
Sir Peter Gleane, 3rd Baronet (c. 1672 – c. 1735)
Sir Peter Gleane, 4th Baronet (c. 1696–1745)

References

Extinct baronetcies in the Baronetage of England
1666 establishments in England